This is a list of jam band music festivals. This list may have some overlap with list of historic rock festivals and list of reggae festivals. Jam bands are musical groups who relate to a unique fan culture that began in the 1960s with Grateful Dead (see deadheads), and continued with The Allman Brothers Band, which had lengthy jams at concerts. The performances of these bands typically feature extended musical improvisation ("jams") over rhythmic grooves and chord patterns, and long sets of music that can often cross genre boundaries.

While the seminal group Grateful Dead are categorized as psychedelic rock, by the 1990s the term "jam band" was being used for groups playing a variety of rock-related genres, and jam band festival lineups could include blues, country music, folk music, and funk. Today the term even includes some groups completely outside rock, such as those playing world music, electronic music, progressive bluegrass, and jazz fusion. A unique feature of the jam band scene is bands allowing fan taping or digital recording of live concerts.

List of festivals

United States

See also 

Related lists
List of free festivals
List of historic rock festivals
List of jam bands
List of jazz festivals
List of music festivals

Related categories
:Category:Jam band festivals
:Category:Jazz festivals
:Category:Music festivals
:Category:Reggae festivals
:Category:World music festivals

References

External links

Jam bands
Jam